Moss Agate Creek is a stream in the U.S. state of South Dakota.

Moss Agate Creek derives its name from deposits of moss agate.

See also
List of rivers of South Dakota

References

Rivers of Fall River County, South Dakota
Rivers of South Dakota